"Another Love Song" is a song by American R&B singer and songwriter Ne-Yo, originally scheduled to appear on his seventh album Good Man which was released on June 8, 2018. The single was released on May 30, 2017 by Motown Records following the release of the previous appetizer song "Earn Your Love".

"Another Love Song" is a groovy dance-pop song combined with the elements of disco and funk, co-written and produced by Cirkut and Dr. Luke.

Background and release
Ne-Yo's upcoming studio album Good Man is set to be released sometime in September 2017 and serve as the follow up to the singer's 2015 album Non-Fiction. After the album's first released song "Earn Your Love" premiered online on May 8, 2017, on May 30, 2017, "Another Love Song" premiered online and was released worldwide as digital download.

Writing and production
At 3:32 in length, "Another Love Song" is an up-tempo upbeat jam song which combines elements of dance and funk. T.J. Rose wrote and recorded the song with producers Cirkut and Dr. Luke, and was mixed by Serban Ghenea.

Music video
The music video was released in July 2017.

Track listing
Digital download
"Another Love Song" – 3:32

Charts

References

External links
 
 
 

2017 songs
2017 singles
Ne-Yo songs
Songs written by Ne-Yo
Songs written by Cirkut (record producer)
Songs written by Dr. Luke
Song recordings produced by Cirkut (record producer)
Song recordings produced by Dr. Luke
Motown singles